David Marshall (October 26, 1846 – February 14, 1920) was a Canadian politician.

Born in Halton County, Canada West, Marshall was a businessman, before being elected to the House of Commons of Canada for the Ontario electoral district of Elgin East in a 1906 by-election, after the sitting MP, Andrew B. Ingram, was appointed Vice Chairman of the Ontario Railway and Municipal Commission. A Conservative, he was re-elected in 1908, 1911, and 1917. He died in office in 1920.

References
 

1846 births
1920 deaths
Conservative Party of Canada (1867–1942) MPs
Members of the House of Commons of Canada from Ontario
Unionist Party (Canada) MPs